This is a list of topics related to racism:

A
 Adolf Hitler
 Adultification bias
 Affirmative action
 Afrocentrism
 Afrophobia
 Alt-right
 Andrew Anglin
 Anti-Arabism
 Anti-Americanism
 Anti-Armenian sentiment
 Anti-Canadian sentiment
 Anti-Chinese sentiment
 Anti-English sentiment
 Anti-Europeanism
 Anti-Finnish sentiment
 Anti-French sentiment
 Anti-German sentiment
 Anti-Hungarian sentiment
 Anti-Indian sentiment
 Anti-Iranian sentiment
 Anti-Irish sentiment
 Anti-Italianism
 Anti-Japanese sentiment
 Anti-Korean sentiment
 Anti-Kurdish sentiment
 Anti–Middle Eastern sentiment
 Anti-miscegenation laws
 Anti-Mongolianism
 Anti-Polish sentiment
 Anti-racism
 Anti-Romani sentiment
 Anti-Russian sentiment
 Antisemitism
 Anti-Slavic sentiment
 Anti-Tibetan sentiment
 Anti-Turkish sentiment
 Anti-Vietnamese sentiment
 Anti-Western sentiment
 Apartheid
 Ariosophy
 Aryan Brotherhood
 Aryan Brotherhood of Texas
 Aryan Circle
 Aryan Nations
 Aryan race
 Aryan Republican Army
 Asian pride
 Assembly of Christian Soldiers
 Atomwaffen Division
 August Kreis
 Aversive racism

B
 16th Street Baptist Church bombing
 The Base (hate group)
 Ben Klassen
 Black Codes (United States)
 Blackface
 Black Hebrew Israelites
 Black Lives Matter
 Black Panther Party
 Black people and Mormonism
 Black people and Mormon priesthood
 Black power
 Black power movement
 Black supremacy
 Blood & Honour
 Bo Gritz
 British Israelism
 British National Party
 Brown v. Board of Education
 Buddy Tucker
 2022 Buffalo shooting
 Bumiputra
 Byron De La Beckwith

C
 Canadian Anti-racism Education and Research Society
 Charleston church shooting
 Charlottesville car attack
 Chevie Kehoe
 Chinese Exclusion Act
 Christchurch mosque shootings
 Christian Defense League
 Christian Identity 
 Christian Nationalist Crusade
 Church of Israel
 Church of Jesus Christ–Christian
 Civil rights movement
 The Covenant, the Sword, and the Arm of the Lord
 Cracker
 Creativity 
 Colorism
 Congress of Racial Equality
Cultural appropriation
Cultural competence
Curse and mark of Cain
Curse of Ham

D
 The Daily Stormer
 La Difesa della Razza
 Dominant minority

E
 Eldred Kurtz Means
 Elohim City, Oklahoma
 2019 El Paso shooting
 Emmett Till
 Environmental racism
 Eric Rudolph
 Ethnic cleansing
 Ethnic conflict
 Ethnic group
 Ethnic issues in Japan
 Ethnic stereotype
 Ethnocentrism
 Ethnocide
 Eugenics

F
 Far-right politics
 Far-right subcultures
 Fascism
 Frazier Glenn Miller Jr.
 French Israelism

G
 Genocide
 George Lincoln Rockwell
 Gerald L. K. Smith
 German-American Bund
 Gordon Kahl
 Greensboro massacre
 Grey Wolves

H
 Hal Turner
 Hammerskins
 Hate crime
 Hate crime laws in the United States
 Hate group
 Hate speech
 Helen Bannerman
 Hispanophobia
 The Holocaust
 Houston Stewart Chamberlain
 Howard Rand
 Human Zoo

I
 Immigration Act of 1917
 Immigration Act of 1924
 Imperium Europa
 Incel
 Indian Citizenship Act
 Roy Innis
 Niger Innis
 International Association of Black Professional Firefighters
 Institute for Historical Review
 Institutional racism
 Isaac Woodard

J
 James Ellison (white supremacist)
 James Wickstrom
 J. B. Stoner
 Jena Six
 Jewish Defense League
 Jim Crow (character)
 Jim Crow laws
 Jump Jim Crow

K
 Kahane Chai
 Kahanism
 Kevin Alfred Strom
 Khazar hypothesis of Ashkenazi ancestry
 Kingdom Identity Ministries
 Kinism
 Knights of the White Camelia
 Ku Klux Klan

L
 LaPorte Church of Christ
 Larry Gene Ashbrook
 Leo Frank
 Liberty Lobby
 Limpieza de sangre
 List of ethnic riots
 List of ethnic slurs
 List of expulsions of African Americans
 List of fascist movements
 List of fascist movements by country
 List of Ku Klux Klan organizations
 List of neo-Nazi organizations
 List of organizations designated by the Southern Poverty Law Center as hate groups
 List of phobias
 List of religious slurs
 List of white nationalist organizations
 Little Rock Nine
 Los Angeles Jewish Community Center shooting
 Louis Beam
 Lynching
 Lynching in the United States
 Lynching of Michael Donald

M
 Malcolm X
 Marcus Garvey
 Martin Luther King Jr.
 Mass racial violence in the United States
 Master race
 Matthew F. Hale
 Medgar Evers
 Mexican Repatriation
 Michael W. Ryan
 Minstrel show
 Minuteman Project
 Miscegenation
 Murders of Chaney, Goodman, and Schwerner
 Myanmar nationality law

N
 Nadir of American race relations
 National Alliance (United States)
 National Socialist Movement (United States)
 National Vanguard (American organization)
 The Nation of Gods and Earths
 Nation of Islam
 Nation of Yahweh
 National Front (France)
 Nationalism
 National States' Rights Party
 Nativism
 Nazi punk
 Nazism
 Negro
 Neo-Confederate
 Neo-fascism
 Neo-Nazism
 New antisemitism
 New Black Panther Party
 New Zealand National Front
 Newham Monitoring Project
 Nick Griffin
 Nigger
 Nordicism
 Nordic Israelism
 Northwest Territorial Imperative

O
 Oath Keepers
 Ocoee massacre
 Operation Red Dog
 Overland Park Jewish Community Center shooting

P
 Palmer Raids
 Patriot Front
 Patriotic Youth League
 Patriots Council
 Paul Fromm (white supremacist)
 Phineas Priesthood
 Pittsburgh synagogue shooting
 Plessy v. Ferguson
 Posse Comitatus
 Poway synagogue shooting
 Police brutality
 Pre-Adamite
 Prejudice
 Proud Boys

Q
 QAnon

R
 Race
 Race and crime in the United States
 Race riot
 Racial Equality Proposal
 Racialism
 Racial discrimination
 Racial hierarchy
 Racial hygiene
 Racial literacy
 Racial realism
 Racial segregation
 Racial tension in Omaha, Nebraska
 Racism
 Racism against Black Americans
 Racism by country
 Racism in Africa
 Racism in Asia
 Racism in Canada
 Racism in Europe
 Racism in horror films
 Racism in North America
 Racism in South America
 Racism in the United States
 Radical right (Europe)
 Radical right (United States)
 Randy Weaver
 Rashism
 Redlining
 Red Shirts
 Red Summer
 Reptilian conspiracy theory
 Reverse discrimination or reverse racism
 Revilo P. Oliver
 Richard Butler (white supremacist)
 Rick Tyler
 Right-wing politics
 Right-wing populism
 Right-wing terrorism
 Robert E. Miles
 Rosa Parks
 Rosewood massacre
 Ruby Ridge

S
 Samuel Bowers
 Scientific racism
 Scottsboro Boys
 Separate but equal
 Serpent seed
 The Shepherd's Chapel
 Silver Legion of America
 Sinhala Only Act
 Skinhead
 Stormfront (website)
 Subhuman
 Supremacism

T
 Thomas Robb (Ku Klux Klan)
 Three-fifths Compromise
 Timeline of Racial Tension in Omaha, Nebraska
 Tom Metzger
 Tulsa Race Riot
 Tatarophobia

U
 Ultranationalism
 2020–2022 United States racial unrest
 Unite the Right rally
 Untermensch
 Ustaše

V
 Vanguard America
 Völkisch movement
 Volksfront

W
 Wesley A. Swift
 White Aryan Resistance
 White Australia policy
 White ethnostate
 White Knights of the Ku Klux Klan
 White nationalism
 White Patriot Party
 White power skinhead
 White pride
 White supremacy
 White trash
 William Dudley Pelley
 William Luther Pierce
 William Shockley
 Willis Carto
 Wilmington insurrection of 1898
 Wotansvolk

X
 Xenophobia
 Xenophobia and racism related to the COVID-19 pandemic

Y
 Yellow Peril

Z
 Zoot Suit Riots

References

Racism
Racism-related topics